The Midtown Mile is a section of Peachtree Street NE in Midtown Atlanta, Georgia, between North Avenue NE and 15th Street NE. Located across the Downtown Connector from Downtown Atlanta, the Midtown Mile is one of the major thoroughfares of central Atlanta in terms of retail and rapid residential development.

History
Although Peachtree Street has long been Atlanta's most famous roadway, the idea of building a dense mixed-use corridor along a stretch of the road in Midtown began in 1997 when a neighbourhood group known as the Midtown Alliance published "Blueprint Midtown," a wide-ranging report advocating the need for pedestrian and transport-based development throughout Midtown, focusing specifically on the Peachtree Street Corridor, which has since been nicknamed "Midtown Mile," a pun on Chicago's Magnificent Mile. Such development had been planned for decades - the Midtown Alliance began in 1978 - but only in recent years has the potential for growth been fully realised.

Retail and landmarks
One of the main goals of the Midtown Mile development is to massively expand the retail footprint in central Atlanta.

Skyscrapers

Many of Atlanta's most important and well-known skyscrapers are located along Midtown Mile. These include:

Transportation

Road transport
Peachtree Street NE is one of the busiest streets in Atlanta. At both ends of Midtown, it connects to the Downtown Connector with the northern entrances corresponding to the end of the concurrency between Interstates 75 and 85; traffic does not immediately head onto Interstate 85 after the split, but rather continues onto Georgia 13, merging onto 85 south of Buckhead.

Public transport
MARTA has three subway stations in the Midtown area, although none have entrances from or exits onto Peachtree Street itself. From north to south, these are Arts Center, Midtown, and North Avenue. To relieve traffic along Peachtree Street, the Peachtree Corridor Partnership has proposed a  streetcar running from southern Atlanta through Midtown to Buckhead along Peachtree Street.

See also
 Atlanta
 Midtown Atlanta
 Peachtree Street

References

External links
 Midtown Alliance
 Midtown Mile

Midtown Atlanta
Roads in Atlanta